is an undersea tunnel in Japan for cars and pedestrians which connects Handa, Aichi with Hekinan, Aichi under the Mikawa Bay at Kinuura Port.  The tunnel provides 2 lanes of road going in each direction, and a separate pedestrian tunnel.  The pedestrian tunnel plays a radio broadcast, and it is accessible by 11 flights of stairs on either side.  Both the Handa side and Hekinan side have public parks near the exits to the tunnel.

See also
 Mikawa Bay
 Handafutō Station

References

Road tunnels in Japan
Toll tunnels in Japan
Undersea tunnels in Asia
Buildings and structures in Aichi Prefecture
Tunnels completed in 1973
Transport in Aichi Prefecture
Roads in Aichi Prefecture
1973 establishments in Japan